Cornalin d'Aoste or Humagne Rouge is a variety of red wine grape. It was named after the Aosta Valley in northwestern Italy where it was wrongly presumed to have originated, and where it is now almost extinct. The wines produced from the variety are wild, rustic and high in tannin.

That Cornalin d'Aoste and Humagne Rouge are in fact the same variety was established by DNA profiling at Changins in Switzerland and Aosta in Italy. At the same time, it was established that it is not related to the white variety Humagne Blanche. Researchers at UC Davis later established that Cornalin d'Aoste is an offspring of Rouge du Pays, also known as Cornalin du Valais.

Synonyms
Cornalin d'Aoste is also known under the synonyms Broblanc Humagne Rouge, Cornalin, Cornalin Aosta, Corniola, Humagne Rouge, and Petit Rouge.

References

Red wine grape varieties